Little Walla Walla River is a stream in the U.S. state of Oregon.

See also
 List of rivers of Oregon

References

Rivers of Umatilla County, Oregon
Rivers of Oregon